KHU or khu may refer to:

 Kyung Hee University, a private research university in South Korea
 KHU, the IATA code for Kremenchuk Airport, Poltava Oblast, Ukraine
 khu, the ISO 639-3 code for Nkumbi language, Angola